Violet Laverne Stanger (1940 – February 6, 2023) was a Canadian politician, who sat in the Legislative Assembly of Saskatchewan from 1991 to 1999. A member of the Saskatchewan New Democratic Party caucus, she represented the electoral district Cut Knife-Lloydminster from 1991 to 1995, and Lloydminster from 1995 to 1999.

Stanger was a supporter of Paul Dewar in the federal 2012 New Democratic Party leadership election, and of Trent Wotherspoon in the provincial 2013 Saskatchewan New Democratic Party leadership election. She died on February 6, 2023 at the age of 82.

References

1940 births
2023 deaths
Saskatchewan New Democratic Party MLAs
Women MLAs in Saskatchewan
21st-century Canadian politicians
20th-century Canadian politicians
20th-century Canadian women politicians
21st-century Canadian women politicians